Kheyrabad (also Romanized as Kheyrābād; also known as Khair Abad Marvdasht and Kheyrābād-e Marvdasht) is a village in Mohammadabad Rural District, in the Central District of Marvdasht County, Fars Province, Iran. At the 2006 census, its population was 792, in 196 families.

References 

Populated places in Marvdasht County